Isidro de Laporta (sometimes La Porta or Porta) (1750–1808) was a Spanish composer and guitarist, active in Madrid during the first years of the 19th century.

Much of Laporta's compositional output is for his own instrument or for salterio, although he also wrote for violin and keyboard. In his day he appears to have been regarded as a major producer of works for guitar. He also composed for the stage, and it was said that his dance music was especially appealing. Known stage works include:

La caracolera y el amolador
La casa de los locos
La sombra chinesca
La zinga

Some of his music is preserved in the collections of the Madrid Conservatory and the city's municipal library.

Several guitar trios by Laporta were recorded along with similar pieces by Antonio Ximénez Brufal for release on the Hungaroton label.

References

1750 births
1808 deaths
Spanish classical composers
Spanish male classical composers
Spanish guitarists
Spanish male guitarists
Musicians from Madrid
18th-century Spanish musicians
18th-century classical composers
18th-century male musicians
19th-century Spanish musicians
19th-century guitarists
19th-century classical composers
19th-century Spanish male musicians